Chigozie Christopher (born 20 April 1992 in Bauchi, Bauchi State) is a Nigerian footballer who plays as a central midfielder for Rangers Football Club of Enugu, Enugu State.

Career
Chigozie began his football career with Bayelsa United and signed for Dolphins F.C of Port Harcourt in 2011 Dolphins F.C., after six months with Dolphins FC he signed for Heartland F.C. of Owerri.

Chiogzie Christopher left Heartland F.C. after a successful season with the Naze Millionaires where he begged the prestigious FA medal within his one-year stay at club his performance earned him the chance to rejoin the newly promoted team in Nigeria Premier League Bayelsa United, and he was very optimistic that Bayelsa United emerged champions that season and also hoping that his performance in 2012/3013 season will earn him a place in the National Teams.

Chigozie signed for Zambia Based Football Club called Zesco United after an explosive performance with Bayelsa United, he returned from a short spell with Zambia Super League  side Zesco United. Where he contributed greatly to the success of the club which lead to the winning of the 2015/2016 Zambia Super League despite having a limited play time.

Lobi Stars F.C, Makurdi Benue State came calling for his signature for a period of six months.

References 

1992 births
Living people
Nigerian footballers
Association football midfielders
Ocean Boys F.C. players
People from Bauchi State